

Statistics Norway demographic statistics 

The following demographic statistics are from the Statistics Norway, unless otherwise indicated.

Age and sex distribution

Age structure

Norway 

(2005 est.) 
0–14 years: 19.7% (male 466,243; female 443,075) 
15–64 years: 65.6% (male 1,234,384; female 1,486,887) 
65 years and over: 14.7% (male 285,389; female 392,331)

Trøndelag 

(2009 est.) 
0–14 years: 19.1% (male 40,746; female 38,777) 
15–64 years: 65.7% (male 141,227; female 130,014) 
65 years and over: 15.0% (male 27,436; female 35,004)

Population

 389,960 (1 January 2000)
 418,453 (1 July 2009)
 Population growth
 28,493 (7.3%)

Population - comparative
slightly larger than Malta, but slightly smaller than Luxembourg.

Population growth rate

1.10% (in 2008)

Population growth rate - comparative
slightly larger than Argentina, but slightly smaller than Ireland.

Total fertility rate

1.90 children born/woman (2007)

Language

Literacy

definition: age 15 and over can read and write 
total population: 100% 
male: NA% 
female: NA%

Demographics of Norway